KWYF-LD (channel 27) is a low-power television station in Casper, Wyoming, United States. It is a translator of dual Fox and MeTV/MyNetworkTV affiliate KFNB (channel 20), which is owned by Coastal Television. KWYF-LD's transmitter is located atop Casper Mountain.

History
A construction permit to construct a low-power television station on UHF channel 26 in Casper was granted on June 15, 1995 and issued the call sign K26ES. Original owner Charles W. Swaner sold K26ES to Wyomedia Corporation on September 15, 1997; the new owners applied for a license to cover on October 29, 1997 and was granted it on January 28, 1998. Initially, K26ES served as a translator of KLWY in Cheyenne; this brought Fox programming to Casper, along with a secondary affiliation with UPN. The station, by then referring to itself as "KWYF," began producing a 9 p.m. newscast on November 3, 2003. On March 8, 2004, K26ES became a full-time UPN affiliate after Fox programming was moved to KFNB; for a time after this change, the station also carried some programming from Pax. Wyomedia also transferred K26ES' newscast to KFNB. When UPN and The WB closed to form The CW in 2006, K26ES became the new network's Casper affiliate.

On March 27, 2012, Wyomedia was granted a construction permit for a digital companion channel for K26ES to operate on channel 27; this facility was issued the call sign K27LZ-D. K27LZ-D filed for its license to cover on June 15, 2012 and was granted it on July 16; on June 13, 2013, the call letters were changed to KWYF-LD. The analog K26ES license remained active until September 12, 2014, when it was canceled by the Federal Communications Commission (FCC).

On January 26, 2015, KWYF became a MeTV affiliate. In addition to airing programing from MeTV, it also airs programing from MyNetworkTV from 7pm-9pm weeknights.

Wyomedia Corporation agreed to sell its stations, including KWYF-LD, to Legacy Broadcasting on February 8, 2018. The sale was canceled on October 2, 2018.

Subchannels
The station's digital signal is multiplexed:

References

External links

WYF-LD
MyNetworkTV affiliates
MeTV affiliates
Low-power television stations in the United States
Natrona County, Wyoming
Television channels and stations established in 1997
1997 establishments in Wyoming